Behavioral strategy refers to the application of insights from psychology and behavioral economics to the research and practice of strategic management. In one definition of the field, "Behavioral strategy merges cognitive and social psychology with strategic management theory and practice. Behavioral strategy aims to bring realistic assumptions about human cognition, emotions, and social behavior to the strategic management of organizations and, thereby, to enrich strategy theory, empirical research, and real-world practice" (Powell, Lovallo & Fox, 2011: 1371).

Meaning 
More specifically, behavioral strategy is as an approach to core issues in strategic management (e.g., CEO and top management team behaviors, entry decisions, competitive interaction, firm heterogeneity) with the following characteristics: 

1)   It is microfoundational (Felin, Foss, & Ployhardt, 2015) in the sense that a psychology-based understanding of the actions and interactions of individuals is used to explain strategy phenomena, often on a higher level of analysis; 

2)   all fields of psychology, as well as relevant parts of behavioral economics and sociology, are seen as potentially applicable to, in principle, any strategic management phenomenon;

3)   assumptions about behaviors and interactions are to be based in evidence (e.g., brought about by means of experiments) rather than the extent to which these allow for mathematical tractability, are "elegant" or similar. 

In terms of methods, behavioral strategy follows strategy research in general by being pluralist, such that qualitative research, lab and field experiments, and agent based modelling, in addition to conventional quantitative and formal methods are all acceptable. However, because of its heavy psychology-emphasis behavioral strategy research may be more disposed towards experiments than most other streams of strategy research.

Study lines
Behavioural finance integrates psychological research that describes how people behave in real life and applies it to finance. Two significant study lines have resulted as a result of this:

The first is about how investor behavior may differ from the textbook definition of an efficient rational investor. The other is how investors who aren't completely rational can cause market prices to vary from their underlying values. 

The first strand of research examines how investors act in order to determine how investing strategies should meet their desires. The second strand of research examines how investor behavior may influence market functioning; It's used to determine whether active investment managers will find it simpler to outperform (short answer is "no").

In 2002, a professor of psychology, Daniel Kahneman, was awarded the Nobel Prize in Economics (who won it jointly with Vernon Smith) in recognition of the contribution that behavioral analysis is now making in financial economics. This research arose from a series of experiments that yielded significant findings about the biases that influence how people make decisions and create preferences. 

Giving investing advice requires a thorough grasp of investor preferences, and understanding investor biases is crucial for predicting how investors will react to specific events or developments. If biases are flaws that could harm an investor's interests, investing advisers should avoid catering to them. This, for example, implies a need for investor education. Investors and their advisers, should be aware of these biases because they will influence how they react to a variety of predicted market movements.

Development 
The use of psychology insights to further research in the behavior and performance of firms has a long history, including research on the behavioral theory of the firm (Cyert & March, 1963; Gavetti, Levinthal, and Ocasio, 2007), aspirations (Greve, 1998), attention (Ocasio, 1997), emotions (Nickerson & Zenger, 2008), goals (Lindenberg & Foss, 2011), cognitive schema, maps, sensemaking, and cognitive rivalry (Porac and Thomas, 1990; Reger and Huff, 1993; Lant and Baum, 1995; Weick, 1995), routines (Cyert & March, 1963), decision theory (Kahneman and Lovallo, 1993), escalation (Staw and Cummings, 1981), motivation, (Foss & Weber, 2016), hubris (Bollaert and Petit, 2010), and top management teams (Hambrick and Mason, 1984), dominant logic (Prahalad & Bettis, 1986), competitive interaction (Chen, Smith & Grimm, 1992), and learning (Levinthal and March, 1993). (The Behavioral Strategy site https://www.behavioralstrategywiki.org/ organizes behavioral strategy papers by juxtaposing concepts (e.g., fairness, emotions, trust, etc.) and phenomena (e.g., global strategy, incentives, CSR, etc.)).  

However, the first explicit use of the term "behavioral strategy" in a journal seems to be in Lovallo and Sibony (2010), which links the term to the behavioral economics literature and the underlying heuristics and biases literature. While Lovallo and Sibony (2010) is a contribution to a practitioner journal, Powell, Lovallo and Fox (2011) edited a special issue on "Psychological Foundations of Strategic Management" of the premier strategy journal, the Strategic Management Journal. Retrospectively, this may be seen as the key event in launching behavioral strategy as a coherent, institutionalized research effort rather than a multitude of relatively unconnected research streams. 

In their editorial essay Powell et al. outline three reasons why there is a need for a concerted research effort in behavioral strategy, namely that strategy has been too slow to incorporate relevant results from psychology, lacks adequate psychological grounding (e.g., heterogeneity is assumed and not explained in terms of reasoning and decision-processes), but recent developments (e.g., cognitive neuroscience developments which make it possible to link strategic decision-making and brain activity) have paved the way for a closer and more coherent integration of the cognitive sciences and strategy.

In an article published the year after the Powell et al. article Rindova, Reger, and Dalpiaz (2012) refer to a "'sociocognitive' perspective" in strategy which, "while varied in its theoretical framings, focuses on the roles of managers' and observers' attention; the bounded rationality of their cognitions, intuitions, and emotions; and the use of biases and heuristics to socially construct "perceptual answers" to traditional strategic management questions about how firms obtain and sustain competitive advantage."

Representation in scholarly associations 
In terms of institutionalization provided by professional and scholarly associations, behavioral strategy research has historically been represented in context of divisions and interest groups of the Academy of Management such as "Managerial and Organizational Cognition", "Business Policy and Strategy" (now "Strategic Management") and "Technology and Innovation Management" .  In 2013, the "Behavioral Strategy Interest Group" was in the context of the Strategic Management Society.

Defining the field of behavioral strategy 
The increasing interest in behavioral strategy has motivated a number of recent attempts to define the field (Powell et al., 2011; Rindova et al., 2012; Hambrick and Crossland, 2019) as well as surveys of theorizing that is either part of behavioral or very closely related, such as surveys of the behavioral theory of the firm (Gavetti, Levinthal, Greve, & Ocasio, 2012) or problemistic search (Posen et al., 2018). For example, Hambrick and Crossland adopt an imagery of alternatively sized tents of behavioral strategy. In the small tent conception, behavioral strategy is "a direct transposition of the logic of behavioral economics (and behavioral finance) to the field of strategic management," whereas in the middle-size conception it is "a commitment to understanding the psychology of strategists," and in the large tent conception it behavioral strategy is basically "all forms and styles of research that consider any psychological, social, or political ingredients in strategic management" (Hambrick and Crossland, 2019).

See also

References 
Bollaert, Helen & Petit, Valérie. 2010. Beyond the dark side of executive psychology: Current research and new directions. European Management Journal. 28(5): 362-376. 

Bridoux, Flore & Stoelhorst, J.W. 2016. Stakeholder Relationships and Social Welfare: A Behavioral Theory of Contributions to Joint Value Creation. Academy of Management Review. 41(2): 229-251. 

Chen, M-J., Smith, Ken G., & Grimm, Curtis M. 1992. Action Characteristics as Predictors of Competitive Responses. Management Science. 38(3): 307-458.   

Cyert, Richard M. & March, James G. 1963. A Behavioral Theory of the Firm. University of Illionois at Urbana-Champaign's Academy for Entrepreneurial Leadership Historical Research Reference in Entrepreneurship. 

Felin, T., Foss, N.J., & Ployhardt, R. 2015. Microfoundations for Management Research." Academy of Management Annals 9: 575–632.

Foss, N.J. & Weber, L. 2016. Putting Opportunism in the Back Seat: Bounded Rationality, Costly Conflict and Hierarchical Forms. Academy of Management Review, 41: 41-79.

Garbuio, M., Porac, J., Lovallo, D. & Dong, A. 2015. A Design Cognition Perspective on Strategic Option Generation. Advances in Strategic Management. 32(1):437-465.

Gavetti, Levinthal, & Ocasio. 2007. Neo-Carnegie: The Carnegie School's Past, Present, and Reconstructing for the Future. Organization Science. 18(3): 523-536. 

Gavetti, G., Levinthal, D., Greve, H. & Ocasio, W. 2012. The Behavioral Theory of the Firm: Assessment and Prospects. The Academy of Management Annals 6(1):1-40.

Greve, Henrich R. 1998. Performance, Aspirations, and Risky Organizational Change. Administrative Science Quarterly. 43(1): 58-86.  

Hambrick, Donald C. & Crossland, Craig. 2018. A strategy for behavioral strategy: Appraisal of small, midsize, and large tent conceptions of this embryonic community. In M. Augier, C. Fang & V. Rindova, eds., Behavioral Strategy in Perspective (Advances in Strategic Management) 39: 22-39. Emerald Publishing. 

Hambrick, Donald C. & Mason, Phyllis A. 1984. Upper Echelons: The Organization as a Reflection of Its Top Managers. The Academy of Management Review. 9 (2): 193-206.

Kahneman, Daniel & Lovallo, Dan. 1993. Timid Choices and Bold Forecasts: A Cognitive Perspective on Risk Taking. Management Science. 39 (1): 17-31. 

Kruglanski, A. W., & Kopetz, C. 2009. What is so special (and nonspecial) about goals? A view from the cognitive perspective. In G. B. Moskowitz & H. Grant, eds., The psychology of goals (p. 27–55). Guilford Press.

Lant, T.K. & Baum J.A.C. 1995. Cognitive sources of socially constructed competitive groups: Examples from the Manhattan hotel industry. In: W. R. Scott & S. Christensen, eds., The Institutional Construcdtion of Organizations. 15-38. Sage Publications. 

Levinthal, Daniel A. & March, James G. 1993. The Myopia of Learning. Strategic Management Journal. 14 (S2): 95-112. 

Lindenberg, S. & Foss, N.J. 2011. Managing Motivation for Joint Production: The Role of Goal Framing and Governance Mechanisms. Academy of Management Review 36: 500-525.

Lovallo, Dan & Sibony, Olivier. 2010.  The Case For Behavioral Strategy. McKinsey Quarterly: 30-40.  

Nickerson, Jack A. & Zenger, Todd R. 2008. Envy, Comparison Costs, and the Economic Theory of the Firm. Strategic Management Journal. 29(13): 1429-1449. 

Ocasio, William. 1997. Towards an Attention-Based View of The Firm. Strategic Management Journal. 18(S1): 187-206. 

Porac, Joseph F. & Thomas, Howard. 1990. Taxonomic Mental Models in Competitor Definition. The Academy of Management Review. 15(2): 224-240. 

Powell, Thomas C., Lovallo, Dan & Fox Craig R. 2011. Behavioral Strategy. Strategic Management Journal. 32(13): 1369-1386. 

Prahalad, C. K. & Bettis, Richard A. 1986. The dominant logic: A new linkage between diversity and performance. Strategic Management Journal 7(6): 485-501. 

Reger, Rhonda K. & Huff, Anne Sigismund. 1993. Strategic groups: A cognitive perspective. Strategic Management Journal. 14(2): 103-123. 

Rindova, Violina P., Reger, Rhonda K., & Dalpiaz, Elena. 2012. The mind of the strategist and the eye of the beholder: The Socio-cognitive perspective in strategy research. In G.B. Dagnino, eds., Handbook of Research on Comptetive Strategy. Edward Elgar Publishing. 

Ryan, Richard M. & Deci, Edward L. 2017. Self-Determination Theory: Basic Psychological Needs in Motivation, Development, and Wellness. Guildford Publications. 

Seminowicz, D.A., Mikulis, D. J.; Davis, K. D. 2004. Cognitive modulation of pain-related brain responses depends on behavioral strategy. Pain 112(1): 48-58.

Staw, Barry M & Cummings, Larry L. 1981. Research in Organizational Behavior. JAI Press.

Weick, Karl E.1995. Sensemaking in Organizations. Sage Publications. University of Michigan.

External links 

 Behavioral Economics The Behavioral Economics Guide
 Behavioral Finance Overview of Behavioral Finance

 
Applied psychology
Behavioral finance
Financial economics
Market trends
Prospect theory